Tuma Tumani (Aymara tuma detour, a long way round, the reduplication signifies that there is a group or a complex of something, -ni a suffix to indicate ownership, "the one with many detours", Hispanicized and broken name Tomaromani) is a mountain in the Andes of southern Peru, about  high. It is situated in the Puno Region, El Collao Province, Capazo District. Tuma Tumani lies east of the mountain Jiwaña at the plain named Jiwaña Pampa. The Jiwaña River flows along its slopes before it reaches the Mawri River (Mauri).

See also 
 Sura Wiqu
 Wanq'uri

References

Mountains of Peru
Mountains of Puno Region